Klekovača is a mountain in the Dinaric Alps of western Bosnia and Herzegovina, located near Drvar and Bosanski Petrovac.

References

Mountains of Bosnia and Herzegovina